The women's K-1 500 metres event was an individual kayaking event conducted as part of the Canoeing at the 1996 Summer Olympics program.

Medalists

Results

Heats
23 competitors entered in three heats. The top three finishers in each heat advanced to the semifinals while the rest competed in the repechages.

Repechages
Two repechages were held. The top four finishers in each repechage and the fastest fifth-place finisher advanced to the semifinals.

Lehrer did not participate in the repechage.

Semifinals
Two semifinals were held. The top four finishers in each semifinal and the fastest fifth-place finisher advanced to the final.

Final
The final was held on August 4.

Three of the finalists (Borchert, Fischer, and Idem) were German-born, but Idem competed for Italy following the 1988 Summer Olympics while Borchert competed for Australia after the 1992 Summer Olympics. Pastuszka was the only finalist under 27 years of age. Kőbán overtook Brunet in the final 50 meters of the event to take the gold medal.

References
1996 Summer Olympics official report Volume 3. pp. 166–7. 
Sports-reference.com 1996 women's K-1 500 m results.
Wallechinsky, David and Jaime Loucky (2008). "Canoeing: Women's Kayak Singles 500 Meters". In The Complete Book of the Olympics: 2008 Edition. London: Aurum Press Limited. p. 492.

Women's K-1 500
Olympic
Women's events at the 1996 Summer Olympics